Bradley Ormond Paul (born 1972, in Baltimore, Maryland) is an American poet and screenwriter.

He graduated from the University of Tennessee at Chattanooga, and the University of Iowa Writers' Workshop.
His work has appeared in American Poetry Review, Boston Review, Smartish Pace, Fence, Pleiades, Iowa Review, and many other journals. He has written for AMC's Lodge 49, TNT's Animal Kingdom, AMC's Better Call Saul and CBS's Hawaii Five-0.

He lives in Los Angeles with his wife, the artist and writer Karri Paul.

Awards
2009 AWP Donald Hall Prize

Works
"My Quietness Has A Man In It"; "Two Front Teeth"; "On The Sleeve"; "It's Weird That So Many Animals Including Us Have Lungs"; "A Monkey Could Write This Poem"; "Immediately Upon Pruning a Favorite Tree", Action, Yes, Summer 2010.
"Seventh of Twelve"; "Homage to Edvard Kocbek"; "Why I Left Nepal"; "Noah Remembers the Coast of Senegal"; "Description of the Salt Cellar", Boston Review, Summer 2000
"Anybody Can Write a Poem", poets.org
 The Obvious New Issues/Western Michigan University, 2004, 
 The Animals All Are Gathering University of Pittsburgh Press, October 28, 2010,

Filmography

References

External links
Author's website
Karri Paul website

American male poets
1972 births
Writers from Baltimore
University of Tennessee at Chattanooga alumni
Iowa Writers' Workshop alumni
Living people
21st-century American poets
21st-century American male writers